The Fly River water rat (Leptomys signatus) is a species of rodent in the family Muridae.
It is found only in Papua New Guinea.
Its natural habitat is subtropical or tropical dry forests.
It is threatened by habitat loss.

References

Leptomys
Endemic fauna of Papua New Guinea
Rodents of Papua New Guinea
Critically endangered fauna of Oceania
Mammals described in 1932
Taxonomy articles created by Polbot
Rodents of New Guinea